The Varduli were a pre-Roman tribe settled in the north of the Iberian Peninsula, in what today is the eastern region of the autonomous community of the Basque Country and western Navarre, in northern Spain. Their historical territory corresponds with current Basque-speaking areas, however it is debated whether the Varduli were actually Aquitanians, related to the Vascones, or if they were Celts, related to tribes such as the Cantabri and Celtiberians and which later underwent Basquisation.

Etymology 

Their ethnonym Varduli is connected with an area that is referred to in documents from the early Middle Ages as Bardulia, which is identified as the cradle of Old Castile. Julio Caro Baroja, a Spanish anthropologist and linguist declared on his works that the term Varduli does not have a Basque origin.

History 

The Varduli are mentioned for the first time during Roman times, by Strabo, who called them Bardyetai, and placed them in the Basque coast, between the Cantabri and Vascones; they are also mentioned by the geographer Ptolemy, who placed them roughly in present-day Gipuzkoa, and by Roman historians, notably Pliny the Elder in his Naturalis Historia, where he reported that Amanum Portus (Roman name: Flaviobriga), present-day Castro Urdiales, was a Varduli city. The Roman geographer Pomponius Mela located them also in the coast, west of the Vascones and east of the Caristii. This lack of agreement about their exact position may have been caused by the continuous movement of the tribes of the northern Iberian Peninsula during events such as the Cantabrian Wars. The first census of the Varduli population took place under the orders of Augustus.

According to Pliny the Elder, the main Vardulian city was Tullonium, that was in the Zadorra (modern name) river basin, on a main Roman road from Virovesca, capital of the Autrigones, to Pompaelo (Pamplona or Iruña) in Vasconian land. According to several Classical antiquity authors such as Ptolemy, Pliny the Elder and Pomponius Mela other Vardulian cities were Alba and Gebala (today's Guevara), in the inland; while Tritium Tuboricum, a little west of the Deba river (Deva, Deua or Deba = Goddess), Menosca and Morogi or Morosgi, were on the Atlantic coast (on the south coast of the Bay of Biscay).

In 114 BC, Gaius Marius had a personal guard made by Varduli people, who were called Barduaioí slaves in Rome. By the year 44, and according to Pomponius Mela, the Varduli inhabited lands close to the Pyrenees and composed a united society. The defeat of the Cantabri against Augustus did not have any effect on the Varduli, as they had not joined the wars. The Varduli served in cohorts in the province of Britannia: Varduli are mentioned in an inscription on a Roman altar at Rochester, (Roman Bremenium) and at Milecastle 19 along Hadrian's Wall an altar inscription made by members of the First Cohort of Varduli, cavalrymen, is one of the few dedications to the Matres, or mother goddesses, found in Roman Britain. The First Cohort of Varduli are also mentioned in inscriptions at the Antonine Wall, Longovicium in Durham, Bremenium and Corstopitum in Northumberland and on the Dere Street in Cappuck in the Scottish Borders.

As with the Caristii, it is discussed whether the Varduli were an Aquitanian tribe or a Celt one, related to the Cantabri and Celtiberians. Their place-names (Toponyms) were clearly of Indo-European origin (probably Proto-Celtic language), as Uxama (comes from Upsama, meaning "the highest"), Deobriga (comes from Deiuo-Briga, meaning "holy hill"), Tullonium (comes from Tullo, meaning "valley"), among others. River-names (Hydronyms) such as Deva, Deua or Deba (Goddess) were also of Indo-European etymology. As with the Caristii, not a single toponym related to the Aquitanian-Basque languages has been found, further proving the theory of their Celtic origin and possible late Basquisation. However, but for a few exceptions (Deba, Zegama, Arakama) present-day place-names show a clear prevalence of the Basque linguistic element (sometimes mixed with Latin and Romance lexical roots).

The last reference to the Varduli appears on a chronicle from Hydatius, where he narrates the devastations that suffered the Heruli when they attacked in the year 400 the Cantabrian coast and again in 456 after attacking Bardulia.

 Later in the next century, Saxons established on the Bordeaux estuary also were known to raid along the coast.

It is believed by some that the Varduli suffered a Basquisation as a result of the continuous progress of the Vascones on their territory. They are not mentioned again in the Early Middle Ages and their place appeared the precursors of the province of Gipuzkoa. Some authors deducted, following Classic documents, the existence of some ethnic affinity, collaboration, or political union between the Caristii, the Autrigones and the Varduli, tribes who later would all be grouped under the name Varduli, this would explain all the later events on this region, for example, why once the Caristii and Varduli were moved out of their original territories by the Vascones in the Early Middle Ages, the Caristii and Autrigones lost their names and were grouped together with the Varduli over the territory of the Autrigones who took refuge in their coastal areas behind the mountains from the Islamic military depredations from the Al-andalus new powers down the Ebro, which passed to be made after a century of resettlement into the Meseta plains as a frontier march or county of the Kingdom of Asturias in the middle years of the 8th century, the original one called Castile. The union, whichever the causes, between Varduli, Caristii and Autrigones on a unique territory would later create the blur County of Bardulia, mentioned as part of the Crown of Castile.

The coat of arms of the Basque province of Gipuzkoa reads "Fidelissima Bardulia, Nunquam Superata", meaning "Most loyal Bardulia, never conquered".

See also
 Pre-Roman peoples of the Iberian Peninsula
 Caristii
 Autrigones
 Cantabri
 Vascones
 Origin of the Basques

References

Pre-Roman peoples of the Iberian Peninsula
Celtic tribes of the Iberian Peninsula
Basque history
Ancient peoples of Spain